The Boca Grande Community Center (also known as Boca Grande School) is a historic site in Boca Grande, Florida, United States. It is located east of Park Avenue, between 1st and 2nd Streets. On March 30, 1995, it was added to the U.S. National Register of Historic Places.

This property is part of the Lee County Multiple Property Submission, a Multiple Property Submission to the National Register.

References

External links
 Lee County listings at National Register of Historic Places
 Florida's Office of Cultural and Historical Programs
 Lee County listings
 Boca Grande Community Center

National Register of Historic Places in Lee County, Florida
Gasparilla Island